The 1996 Robert Morris Colonials football team represented Robert Morris College, now Robert Morris University, as a member of the Northeast Conference (NEC) during the 1996 NCAA Division I-AA football season. The Colonials were led by 3rd-year head coach Joe Walton and played their home games at Moon Stadium on the campus of Moon Area High School. The Colonials finished the 1996 season with a share of the NEC championship in their first year in the conference, and an ECAC Bowl victory in only the third year of the program's existence.

Schedule

References

Robert Morris
Robert Morris Colonials football seasons
Northeast Conference football champion seasons
ECAC Bowl champion seasons
Robert Morris Colonials football